The Bulgarian Basketball Super Cup is an annual cup competition, organized by the Bulgarian Basketball Federation since 2016. BC Levski Sofia is the all-time record holder with 2 titles.

Title holders
 2016 Academic Sofia
 2017 Beroe
 2018 Levski Sofia
 2019 Levski Sofia
 2021 Rilski Sportist
 2022 Rilski Sportist

Recent finals

Titles by team

References

bgbasket.com
Official Website
Eurobasket.com League Page

 
Basketball competitions in Bulgaria
Recurring sporting events established in 1951
1951 establishments in Bulgaria